Iron Mike Productions (formerly Acquinity Sports) was a boxing promotion company, based in Deerfield Beach, Florida, United States.  Acquinity Sports was founded in 2012 by Garry Jonas, CEO of Acquinity Interactive which abruptly ceased operations in 2013 after an FTC complaint.
 Jonas partnered with former heavyweight champion Mike Tyson in 2013, and changed the name of the company to Iron Mike Productions. They represented a diverse roster of boxers., including two-time Iraq War Veteran and undefeated Sammy Vazquez, Jr., Ukrainian amateur world champion, Ivgen Khytrov, super bantamweight champion JC Payano, and top U.S. amateur prospect, Erickson Lubin.

Key people
 Mike Tyson, Owner
 Garry Jonas, CEO - NO LONGER AFFILIATED http://dc.org/files/negative_dnssec
 Azim Spicer, COO - NO LONGER AFFILIATED

Fighters

Notable events
Acquinity Sport's debut event was held on January 7, 2012 at Hollywood’s Westin Diplomat Resort and Spa, and was featured as the season opener of Telefutura's Solo Boxeo series.  Its second major event, branded  "D-Day, Dominican Domination" aired on ESPN 2's Friday Night Fights on March 2, 2012, and featured headliner Joan "Baby Tyson" Guzman, who had recently signed on with Acquinity Sports.  On November 30, 2012, Acquinity and bsavings.com presented a combination boxing-music event. Dubbed "Beatdown 2012," it featured a championship fight between Guzman and Khabib Allakhverdiev, followed by musical performances by Fabolous, Flo Rida, Waka Flocka, DMX, Travis Porter and Fat Joe.

Name change
In 2013 Acquinity CEO Garry Jonas and former heavyweight champion Mike Tyson partnered and formed Iron Mike Productions.  This marked the hall-of-famer's return to boxing since his last appearance in the ring in 2005.  The new promotion company's debut took place on August 23, 2013, at the Turning Stone Resort Casino in Verona, New York, and will be broadcast live on ESPN2's Friday Night Fights.

References

External links
 Iron Mike Productions Official Site
 Iron Mike Productions Facebook Page

Boxing promoters
Sports event promotion companies